Peter Gavin Hall  (20 November 1951 – 9 January 2016) was an Australian researcher in probability theory and mathematical statistics. The American Statistical Association described him as one of the most influential and prolific theoretical statisticians in the history of the field.
The School of Mathematics and Statistics Building at The University of Melbourne was renamed the Peter Hall building in his honour on 9 December 2016.

Education
Hall attended Sydney Technical High School in Bexley, NSW during the years 1964-1969. He placed consistently high in examination results and in his final year, was among the top achievers in his form, and the winner of Old Boys' Union Mathematics prize.

Hall earned his Doctor of Philosophy degree at the University of Oxford in 1976 for research supervised by John Kingman.

Career and research

Hall was an author in probability and statistics. MathSciNet lists him with 606 publications as of January 2016.  Google Scholar lists his h-index as 113. He made contributions to nonparametric statistics, in particular for curve estimation and resampling: the bootstrap method, smoothing, density estimation, and bandwidth selection. He worked on numerous applications across fields of economics, engineering, physical science and biological science. Hall also made contributions to surface roughness measurement using fractals. In probability theory he made many contributions to limit theory, spatial processes and stochastic geometry. His paper "Theoretical comparison of bootstrap confidence intervals" (Annals of Statistics, 1988) has been reprinted in the Breakthroughs in Statistics collection.

He was an Australian Research Council (ARC) Laureate Fellow at the School of Mathematics and Statistics, University of Melbourne, and also had a joint appointment at University of California Davis. He previously held a professorship at the Centre for Mathematics and its Applications at the Australian National University.
He was an ISI Highly Cited Researcher.
He is one of only three researchers based outside of North America to win the prestigious COPSS presidents' Award.

Honours and awards
His awards and honours included:

 2015 Fellow of the Academy of Social Sciences in Australia
 2013 Foreign Associate, National Academy of Sciences
 2013 Officer of the Order of Australia
 2012 Wilks Memorial Award
 2011 Australian Laureate Fellowship
 2011 Guy Medal in Silver
 2010 George Szekeres Medal
 2009 Honorary Doctor of Science degree from The University of Sydney
 2007 Matthew Flinders Medal and Lecture
 2000 Elected a Fellow of the Royal Society (FRS)
 1998 Invited Speaker of the International Congress of Mathematicians
 1996 Fellow of the American Statistical Association
 1994 Hannan Medal of the Australian Academy of Science
 1990 Pitman Medal from the Statistical Society of Australia
 1989 Committee of presidents of Statistical Societies Award
 1987 Fellow of the Australian Academy of Science
 1986 Rollo Davidson Prize, University of Cambridge
 1986 Australian Mathematical Society Medal
 1986 Edgeworth David Medal, Royal Society of New South Wales
 1984 Fellow of Institute of Mathematical Statistics

Published books
 P. Hall; C.C. Heyde (1980): Martingale Limit Theory and its Application, Academic Press, New York. 
 P. Hall (1982): Rates of Convergence in the Central Limit Theorem, Pitman, London. 
 P. Hall (1988): Introduction to the Theory of Coverage Processes, Wiley, New York. 
 P. Hall (1992): The Bootstrap and Edgeworth Expansion, Springer, New York.

Personal life
Peter Hall was born to radiophysics and radio astronomy pioneer Ruby Payne-Scott and telephone technician William Holman Hall. His younger sister is artistic photographer and sculptor, Fiona Margaret Hall. Hall was a keen photographer with a special interest in train photography. He enjoyed travel and was a regular visitor to many universities around the
world. He died of leukaemia in Melbourne on 9 January 2016. He is survived by his wife, Jeannie.

References

1951 births
2016 deaths
Australian statisticians
Probability theorists
Officers of the Order of Australia
Fellows of the Australian Academy of Science
Fellows of the Academy of the Social Sciences in Australia
Fellows of the Royal Society
Fellows of the American Statistical Association
Foreign associates of the National Academy of Sciences
Academic staff of the University of Melbourne
Academic staff of the Australian National University
Alumni of the University of Oxford
University of Sydney alumni
Australian National University alumni
Presidents of the Institute of Mathematical Statistics
Deaths from leukemia
Deaths from cancer in Victoria (Australia)
Annals of Statistics editors
Mathematical statisticians